TSS Duke of Lancaster is a former railway steamer passenger ship that operated in Europe from 1956 to 1979, and is beached near Mostyn Docks, on the River Dee, north-east Wales. It replaced an earlier 3,600-ton ship of the same name operated by the London Midland and Scottish Railway company between Heysham and Belfast.

In service

Along with her sister ships the TSS Duke of Rothesay and the TSS Duke of Argyll she was amongst the last passenger-only steamers built for British Railways (at that time, also a ferry operator). She was a replacement for the 1928 steamer built by the London Midland and Scottish Railway, RMS Duke of Lancaster.

Built at Harland & Wolff, Belfast, launched on 1 December 1955 and completed in 1956, she was designed to operate as both a passenger ferry (primarily on the Heysham to Belfast route) and as a cruise ship. In this capacity, the Duke of Lancaster travelled to the Scottish islands and further afield to Belgium, Denmark, Netherlands, Norway and Spain.

From the mid-1960s, passenger ships such as the Duke of Lancaster were gradually being superseded by car ferries. Rather than undertake the expensive option of renewing their entire fleet, British Railways instead began a part-programme of conversion. In order to maintain ferry services whilst these modifications took place, the Duke of Lancaster'''s duties as a cruise ship ceased.News Railway Gazette 19 September 1969 page 683 On 25 April 1970 the ship returned to service, having had her main deck rebuilt to accommodate vehicles via a door at her stern. The ship now provided space for 1,200 single-class passengers and 105 cars, with a total cabin accommodation for 400 passengers.

The three ships continued on the Heysham to Belfast route until the service was withdrawn on 5 April 1975. The Duke of Lancaster was then briefly employed on the Fishguard to Rosslare crossing, before becoming the regular relief vessel on the Holyhead to Dún Laoghaire service until November 1978. The ship was then laid up at Barrow-in-Furness.

Fun Ship

The Duke of Lancaster arrived in Llanerch-y-Mor, North Wales, in August 1979 to start her new life as "the Fun Ship". However, there were frequent legal battles with the local councils and the owners closed the business in 2004. As a result of this the owners "walked away".  Subsequent owners have faced similar issues.

Despite having large amounts of its exterior paintwork covered in rust, the interior of the ship is in good condition. It was featured in the 2011 series of BBC Two's Coast''.

In early 2012 several local arcade game collectors made a deal with Solitaire Liverpool Ltd and were able to purchase most of the coin-operated machines left behind inside the ship at the time the Fun Ship closed. Removing the games required the use of cranes and other heavy lifting equipment.

Art gallery

The plan was to transform the ship into the largest open air art gallery in the UK. As of August 2012, the Latvian graffiti artist "KIWIE" was commissioned to spraypaint a design on the ship. The ship was covered with graffiti described as "bright and surreal". The first phase of the project saw Kiwie and other European graffiti artists paint murals on the ship between August and November 2012, and the second phase (starting at the end of March 2013) included the work of British-based artists such as Snub23, Spacehop, Dan Kitchener and Dale Grimshaw. One of the artworks is a picture of the ship's first captain, John 'Jack' Irwin. However in 2017 both sides of the ship were painted black.

As of 2021 the interior of the ship was undergoing restoration work and deck areas refurbished for use as a dockside attraction.

References

External links

 GoogleMap location 

Passenger ships of the United Kingdom
Ferries of the United Kingdom
1955 ships
Ferries of Wales
Ships built in Belfast
Ships of British Rail
Ships built by Harland and Wolff
Ships and vessels on the National Register of Historic Vessels